San Bernardo is a town in Chaco Province, Argentina. It is the head town of the O'Higgins Department.

Economy
The local economy is based on agriculture and forestry, the main produce being cotton, soya, sunflowers and wheat.

External links

Populated places in Chaco Province
Populated places established in 1933